Sunita Singh is a Member of the Legislative Assembly from Zamania seat in Ghazipur district of Uttar Pradesh. She contested the Uttar Pradesh assembly elections held in 2017 with BJP ticket and defeated her close contestant Atul Rai by 9264 votes.

Early life
Singh was born in Chatra district of Jharkhand. She completed her graduation from Banaras Hindu University in 1986.

She is married to Parikshit Singh.

Posts held

See also
Uttar Pradesh Legislative Assembly

References

Living people
Bharatiya Janata Party politicians from Uttar Pradesh
Uttar Pradesh MLAs 2017–2022
Politicians from Ghazipur
Year of birth missing (living people)